John Rodney Sanao Brondial (born November 20, 1990) is a Filipino professional basketball player for the San Miguel Beermen of the Philippine Basketball Association (PBA). He played college basketball for Adamson University in the UAAP. He was drafted 6th overall by Barangay Ginebra in the 2014 PBA draft.

Amateur career
Brondial was discovered by then Adamson coach Leo Austria while playing in an inter-barangay league at Philam Homes in West Avenue, Quezon City where Austria, who happened to be in the neighborhood visiting a relative, spotted him playing in a championship game.

Professional career
After finishing his studies at Adamson, Brondial applied for the 2014 PBA draft. He was picked by Ginebra with their 6th overall pick.

On November 16, 2015 Brondial and a 2018 second round pick were traded to Barako Bull in exchange for Jervy Cruz.

On May 11, 2016 Brondial was traded to the Magnolia/Star Hotshots along with RR Garcia for two rookies Mark Cruz along with Norbert Torres and veteran guard Jonathan Uyloan. In his second year with the team, Brondial won his first PBA championship against the Alaska Aces in Game 6 of the 2018 Governors' Cup finals series, 4–2.

Brondial was part of the trade that sent Alaska guard Chris Banchero to the Star Hotshots in the latter part of 2019. Brondial was seen as "super reliable" by his new coach, Jeffrey Cariaso, as he flourishes as one of the big men of the Aces, who beat the NorthPorth Batang Pier at the resumption of the "PBA bubble" on November 6, 2020 when he scored 16 points and grabbed 10 rebounds.

On January 6, 2022, Brondial became an unrestricted free agent. He was offered a two-year contract extension but declined. Later that day, he signed a three-year contract with the San Miguel Beermen.

PBA career statistics

As of the end of 2021 season

Season-by-season averages

|-
| align=left | 
| align=left | Barangay Ginebra
| 26 || 11.4 || .509 || .000 || .545 || 3.5 || .4 || .2 || .2 || 2.5
|-
| align=left rowspan=4| 
| align=left | Barangay Ginebra
| rowspan=4|29 || rowspan=4|12.6 || rowspan=4|.465 || rowspan=4|.556 || rowspan=4|.536 || rowspan=4|4.6 || rowspan=4|.4 || rowspan=4|.2 || rowspan=4|.3 || rowspan=4|3.9
|-
| align=left | Barako Bull
|-
| align=left | Phoenix
|-
| align=left | Star
|-
| align=left | 
| align=left | Star
| 36 || 8.0 || .452 || .172 || .500 || 2.8 || .3 || .3 || .1 || 2.5
|-
| align=left | 
| align=left | Magnolia
| 54 || 8.2 || .462 || .259 || .600 || 2.4 || .3 || .2 || .1 || 2.4
|-
| align=left rowspan=2| 
| align=left | Magnolia
| rowspan=2|46 || rowspan=2|14.5 || rowspan=2|.421 || rowspan=2|.180 || rowspan=2|.621 || rowspan=2|5.2 || rowspan=2|.5 || rowspan=2|.2 || rowspan=2|.2 || rowspan=2|4.8
|-
| align=left | Alaska
|-
| align=left | 
| align=left | Alaska
| 12 || 19.9 || .604 || .538 || .647 || 6.0 || .7 || .3 || .6 || 6.8
|-
| align=left rowspan=2| 
| align=left | Alaska
| rowspan=2|23 || rowspan=2|17.5 || rowspan=2|.467 || rowspan=2|.333 || rowspan=2|.632 || rowspan=2|5.6 || rowspan=2|1.0 || rowspan=2|.4 || rowspan=2|.6 || rowspan=2|5.2
|-
| align=left | San Miguel
|-
|-class=sortbottom
| align=center colspan=2 | Career
| 226 || 12.0 || .464 || .266 || .590 || 4.0|| .5 || .2 || .2 || 3.6

Personal life
Brondial was born to Anselmo and Florinda Brondial and is the eldest child. He has two brothers, namely Raymond and Oliver Allan, and three sisters, namely Agatha, Alexis Chryselle and Cristine Jane.

References

1990 births
Living people
Adamson Soaring Falcons basketball players
Alaska Aces (PBA) players
Barako Bull Energy players
Barangay Ginebra San Miguel draft picks
Barangay Ginebra San Miguel players
Basketball players from Quezon City
Centers (basketball)
Filipino men's basketball players
Magnolia Hotshots players
Phoenix Super LPG Fuel Masters players
Power forwards (basketball)
San Miguel Beermen players